The episodes of the anime series Gunslinger Girl are based on the Gunslinger Girl manga series written and illustrated by Yu Aida. There are a total of twenty-eight episodes split over two seasons/series. Set in modern-day Italy, the series revolves around the Social Welfare Agency, a government-funded organisation which is supposed to provide advanced medical care to those in need. This, however, is a cover for a far different agenda: the patients, adolescent girls who have survived traumatic events, are brainwashed into forgetting their past, turned into cyborgs, trained in the use of weapons and used as assassins to battle enemies of the State. Each girl is assigned to an adult whose job is to provide the girl with training and act as a mentor and authority figure. The relationship between the cyborg-girls and their "handlers" forms the basis of much of the plot and varies from the affectionate to the indifferent with varying degrees of results.

The first series' episodes were directed by Morio Asaka, animated by Madhouse Studios, and produced by Bandai Visual, Marvelous Entertainment, MediaWorks, and Madhouse Studios. It adapts the first two manga volumes of the series over thirteen episodes which aired in Japan from October 9, 2003 to February 19, 2004 on Bandai Channel and Fuji Television. Set in contemporary Italy, the series tells about young girls who are turned into cyborgs, trained as assassins by adult male "handlers" and their missions against terrorists and gangsters on behalf of a secretive government agency. A sequel called Gunslinger Girl -Il Teatrino-, directed by Hiroshi Ishiodori and animated by Artland, aired in Japan on Tokyo MX TV from January 8, 2008 to April 1, 2008. It adapts the third, fourth and fifth volumes of the manga over fifteen episodes, with thirteen episodes airing on television and the final two released directly to DVD.

Production
The series is licensed for English adaptation by Funimation. The English dub of the anime aired in the United States on the Independent Film Channel. A single DVD box collection, containing all thirteen episodes of the first series, was released in Japan by Marvelous Entertainment on March 10, 2005. Funimation has released three DVD compilations of the English adaptation of the series, with the first compilation containing the first five episodes, with four episodes in the other two compilations. The first compilation was released on May 17, 2005, the second on July 12, 2005, and the third on September 6, 2005. Funimation has additionally released a collection box containing all three compilations; it was released on December 11, 2007. The episode titles of both the English and Japanese adaptations are given in Italian, with the corresponding kanji preceding the Italian title in the latter. A DVD compilation of the second season, containing the first episode of the anime, was released by Media Factory on March 25, 2008. Funimation has licensed the second season and is streaming the English subtitled episodes on their website as well as on Veoh, promising a Region 1 retail release in 2009.  Unlike the first season of the series, which mixed Italian with the Japanese kanji in the titles, Il Teatrinos titles are pure Japanese.

Two pieces of theme music are used for the first series; one opening theme and one ending theme. Gunslinger Girl -Il Teatrino- also uses four pieces of theme music. The closing theme was replaced by "Scarborough Fair" (by Aoi Tada) for episode 8 and "human" (by Lia) for episode 13.

Episode list

Gunslinger Girl

Gunslinger Girl -Il Teatrino-

See also
List of Gunslinger Girl chapters
List of Gunslinger Girl characters

References

External links
 Official website 
 Official Fuji Television website for the anime 
 Official FUNimation website for the anime
 
 
 

Gunslinger Girl